United Cerebral Palsy (UCP) is an international nonprofit charitable organization consisting of a network of affiliates. UCP is a leading service provider and advocate for adults and children with disabilities. As one of the largest health nonprofits in the United States, the UCP mission is to advance the independence, productivity and full citizenship of people with disabilities through an affiliate network.

History
UCP was founded in 1949 by Leonard Goldenson (who later became Chairman of the broadcast network ABC) and his wife Isabel, and Jack and Ethel Hausman. United Cerebral Palsy pioneered the use of fundraising telethons.

Service provider
UCP, through its more than 66 local affiliates across the United States, as well as in Canada and Australia, provide a broad array of services and resources to children and adults with a broad range of disabilities. Each affiliate provides a different menu of services tailored to their local needs and capabilities, but often include education, employment, health & wellness, housing, parenting & family training and support, sports & leisure, transportation, and travel assistance. UCP has a combined budget of more than $750 million for research, public policy advocacy and direct services. System-wide, an average of 85 percent of all revenue is dedicated to programs.

Advocacy
In addition to raising money for services and research, UCP also engages in public policy advocacy, including promoting access and opportunity for people with disabilities, and the provision of services. In the United States, UCP was one of the catalyst organizations advocating for the adoption of the Americans With Disabilities Act in 1990. More recently, UCP has been on the cutting edge of disabilities rights with programs such as Life Labs, a national initiative to foster innovation and technology.

Calls for name change
In April 2013, United Cerebral Palsy of Central Maryland announced that it would change its name from UCP to Unified Community Connections to make it clearer which clientele is served by the organization. Other affiliates have chosen not to include the phrase "United Cerebral Palsy," as part of their doing business as names or logos even if it might remain part of their legal names, in an effort to be more encompassing of their programs and services.

In 2013, the United Cerebral Palsy of Greater Chicago merged with Seguin Services and are now known as UCP Seguin of Greater Chicago.

Leadership
UCP is led by a 16-person Board of Trustees and President/CEO Armando A. Contreras. The headquarters is in Washington, DC.

Accreditation
UCP meets the standards of the National Health Council and the Better Business Bureau/Wise Giving Alliance.

References

External links
 
 Herald and Review, March 4, 2008 Celebrity dance partners step out to aid United Cerebral Palsy
 KPHO Television News, March 27, 2008 – Copper Thieves Hit Cerebral Palsy Facility. 'Loss Of Therapy Troubling,' Official Says
 The New York Times, Saturday, November 20, 1954. United Cerebral Palsy Reports Increase In Research Funds, Topping $500,000

Organizations established in 1949
Disability rights organizations
Health charities in the United States
Cerebral palsy organizations
Disability organizations based in the United States
Disability law advocacy groups in the United States
Medical and health organizations based in Washington, D.C.
1949 establishments in the United States
1949 establishments in Washington, D.C.